Nadiuska is a retired Polish and Russian model and actress who became a well-known celebrity in Spain during the 1970s. Born as Roswicha Bertasha Smid Honczar in 1952 in Bavaria to Polish and Russian parents, she moved to Barcelona in 1971 and her career rapidly took off. She appeared in a number of sex comedies over the next decade, and appeared nude in Playboy. She played Conan's mother in the 1982 Arnold Schwarzenegger film Conan the Barbarian. She co-starred with Spanish horror star Paul Naschy in his science fiction film The People Who Own The Dark. Years later she was committed to a psychiatric ward with schizophrenia.

Filmography

References

Bibliography

External links
 

1952 births
Living people
Actors from Bavaria
German emigrants to Spain
German people of Polish descent
German people of Russian descent
German television actresses
People from Regensburg
Spanish film actresses
Spanish people of German descent
Spanish people of Polish descent
Spanish people of Russian descent
Spanish television actresses